Khalifa International Stadium is a multi-purpose stadium located in Al Rayyan, Qatar, around  west from the centre of Doha. Its ground comprises a running track and a grass pitch. Opened in 1976, the stadium was named after then-Emir of Qatar Khalifa bin Hamad Al Thani, and under the ownership of the Qatar Football Association, it serves as the primary home ground of the Qatar men's national football team. Its current fully-roofed, 45,857-seat configuration was opened in 2017, following a previous reconfiguration in 2005 that incorporated the stadium into the Aspire Zone complex and added a roofed grandstand; boosting its capacity from 20,000 to 40,000. 

Khalifa has hosted numerous international association football and athletics events throughout its history. Track and field events at the 2006 Asian Games, 2011 Pan Arab Games, and 2019 World Athletics Championships were held at the stadium, and World Athletics has since organised the annual Doha Diamond League event there as part of its Diamond League series. In the future, Khalifa is planned to host track and field events at the 2030 Asian Games. In association football, the stadium hosted matches during the 2022 FIFA World Cup, the 2019 FIFA Club World Cup, the 1995 FIFA World Youth Championship, the 2011 AFC Asian Cup, and three editions of the Arabian Gulf Cup. The final of the Emir of Qatar Cup is also occasionally played at the stadium.

History 
Khalifa International Stadium opened in 1976, ahead of the 4th Arabian Gulf Cup, with a mostly symmetrical stadium bowl and a basic roof covering the upper seats of the stadium's western stand. The stadium hosted all 22 games of the tournament, which was won by Kuwait. Sixteen years later, the stadium once again hosted all 15 games of the 11th Arabian Gulf Cup in 1992, which saw hosts Qatar win the Arabian Gulf Cup the very first time. 

In preparation for Doha's hosting of the 2006 Asian Games, Khalifa International Stadium was renovated with a complete remodelling of the stadium's western stand, which transformed it into a grandstand with a second tier and a new roof that covered all the seats. Over the eastern side, a large arch with additional light fixtures were added, which was used as a platform; this was used during the games' opening ceremony to launch fireworks from. The stadium's reconfiguration in 2005 was part of the larger Doha Sports City urban renewal project in Al Rayyan, later known as the Aspire Zone complex. Today, it includes the Aspire Academy, Hamad Aquatic Centre, and the Aspire Tower. The ceremonies and track and field events of the 2011 Pan Arab Games were also held at Khalifa a few years later.

After the rights to host the 2022 FIFA World Cup were awarded to Qatar in December 2010, Khalifa International Stadium was reconfigured again to stage matches during the tournament. An initial plan to upgrade the stadium's capacity to at least 68,000 was mulled but later revised. The final design by international architecture firm Dar Al-Handasah, saw the stadium's capacity boosted to 45,857 with the addition of a new tier on the eastern stand, and a new roof covering the entire stadium was built. Upon its reopening in 2017, it became the first stadium to receive a four-star rating from the FIFA-endorsed Global Sustainability Assessment System of the Middle East and North Africa, and was the first of the eight venues of the FIFA World Cup to open. Since its reopening, the stadium hosted the 2019 World Athletics Championships, and three matches of the 2019 FIFA Club World Cup, including its final.

International matches

Tournament results

4th Arabian Gulf Cup

11th Arabian Gulf Cup

1998 Arab Cup

2011 AFC Asian Cup 
Khalifa International Stadium hosted 6 matches during the 2011 AFC Asian Cup, including the final.

24th Arabian Gulf Cup

2022 FIFA World Cup 
Khalifa International Stadium hosted 8 matches during the 2022 FIFA World Cup, including the third place play-off match.

Friendly

References

External links 

 Khalifa International Stadium at Qatar 2022

2022 FIFA World Cup stadiums
Football venues in Qatar

1976 establishments in Qatar
Asian Games athletics venues
Athletics (track and field) venues in Qatar
Diamond League venues
Multi-purpose stadiums in Qatar
Qatar
Sports venues completed in 1976
Sports venues in Doha
Stadiums of the Asian Games
Venues of the 2006 Asian Games
Venues of the 2030 Asian Games